Juan Díaz Sánchez (6 October 1948 – 3 April 2013), commonly known as Juanito, was a Spanish footballer who played as a forward.

Career
Born in Santa Cruz de Tenerife, Canary Islands, Juanito started and finished his 11-year professional career with hometown's CD Tenerife. He played one season in Segunda División with the club, then signed with FC Barcelona in late February 1972. He made his La Liga debut on 19 March, starting in a 1–0 away win against Athletic Bilbao.

Juanito contributed with 17 games in the 1973–74 campaign as the Catalans won the national championship, scoring in a 3–0 home victory over UD Las Palmas on 6 January 1974. He appeared in three UEFA Cup matches during his spell, netting against OGC Nice in the 1973–74 edition.

In 1975, in another winter transfer window move, Juanito joined fellow league team Hércules CF for three years. In the 1976 summer, however, he moved to UD Salamanca, going on to compete a further five seasons in the top level; two of his league goals came against former side Barcelona (13 February 1977, 2–0 home win) and Real Madrid (1–1 home draw, on 16 March 1980).

Juanito retired in 1983 at the age of 34, after one-year spells with Tenerife and amateurs CD Mensajero.

Death
Juanito lost a son whilst a player of Hércules, aged only 15. He himself died on 3 April 2013 in his hometown, at 64.

Honours
Barcelona
La Liga: 1973–74

References

External links

1948 births
2013 deaths
Spanish footballers
Footballers from Santa Cruz de Tenerife
Association football forwards
La Liga players
Segunda División players
Segunda División B players
CD Tenerife players
FC Barcelona players
Hércules CF players
UD Salamanca players
CD Mensajero players